Withers is an unincorporated community in Gilmer County, in the U.S. state of West Virginia.

History
A post office called Withers was established in 1903, and remained in operation until 1953. The community was named after John Scott Withers, a local lawyer.

References

Unincorporated communities in Gilmer County, West Virginia
Unincorporated communities in West Virginia